Thomas de Villardi (born 27 March 1994) is a French footballer who currently plays for Charlotte Independence in the USL Championship.

Career

Youth
De Villardi played for Club Olympique Vincennois between the ages of 6 and 14. He then competed with the Val-de-Marne district team in the Paris interdistrict tournament and was spotted by Ligue 1 club Guingamp. After a three or four day trial, he was signed by the club and stayed for four years before leaving in 2013 to play college soccer in the United States. He made one appearance for the club's reserve side in the CFA 2 during the 2012/13 season.

College
De Villardi played two seasons of college soccer with the Dukes of Duquesne University. Over that time, he made a total of 27 appearances for the team, scoring two goals. During his freshman year, he appeared in every match and was named to the Atlantic 10 All-Rookie Team. For his junior and senior seasons, he transferred to the University of Delaware. For the 2015 season he earned NSCAA All-Midwest Region Third Team and All-CAA First Team honors while tallying nine assists. His nine assists led the conference and was 21st nationally. It also tied a single-season school record in that category. For the 2015 season he made 19 appearances tallying two goals and nine assists. In 2016, he made 20 appearances while scoring two goals and tallying four assists.

Semi-professional
In 2014, de Villardi signed for the Seattle Sounders FC U-23 team of the Premier Development League. He made one appearance for the club during the season.

De Villardi was signed by New York Red Bulls U-23, also of the PDL, for the 2016 season. Over the season, he made eight appearances, scoring one goal. He was also part of the club's squad for their opening round defeat to the New York Pancyprian-Freedoms during the 2016 Lamar Hunt U.S. Open Cup. However, he did not appear in the match.

Professional
De Villardi was selected 42nd overall by Minnesota United FC in the 2017 MLS SuperDraft. About drafting de Villardi, Minnesota head coach Adrian Heath said, "...we've taken somebody that we were worried was going to get taken before because it's someone Amos has seen and likes a lot so it's we're really pleased with what we've done today.”

On 29 November 2018, de Villardi signed for USL Championship side Austin Bold FC ahead of their inaugural season.

In March 2021, de Villardi joined Charlotte Independence for the 2021 season.

References

External links

Minnesota United profile
PDL profile
Delaware Blue Hens profile
Duquesne Dukes profile

1994 births
Living people
Association football defenders
Association football midfielders
Austin Bold FC players
Charlotte Independence players
Delaware Fightin' Blue Hens men's soccer players
Duquesne Dukes men's soccer players
French footballers
French expatriate footballers
French expatriate sportspeople in the United States
Minnesota United FC draft picks
Minnesota United FC players
New York Red Bulls U-23 players
People from Vincennes
Seattle Sounders FC U-23 players
Footballers from Val-de-Marne
USL Championship players
USL League Two players